Khirbet Nisaf is a Syrian hamlet in Awj Nahiyah in Masyaf District, Hama.  According to the Syria Central Bureau of Statistics (CBS), Khirbet Nisaf had a population of 50 .

References 

Populated places in Masyaf District